Marisol Espineira (born 27 June 1968) is a Peruvian table tennis player. She competed in the women's singles event at the 2004 Summer Olympics.

References

1968 births
Living people
Peruvian female table tennis players
Olympic table tennis players of Peru
Table tennis players at the 2004 Summer Olympics
Place of birth missing (living people)